Eois apyraria is a moth in the family Geometridae. It is found in French Guiana.

References

Moths described in 1858
Eois
Moths of South America